The Khumalo gang was an armed group in the Joe Slovo section in South Africa. It was led by Mbhekiseni Khumalo, the founder of a small Zionist Christian sect. It was allied with the Inkatha Freedom Party.

References

History of South Africa
Inkatha Freedom Party
Gangs in South Africa